Simon Francis Murphy (born 26 August 1973 in Balmain, Sydney) is an international award-winning, Dutch-based, Australian conductor and viola player with a focus on the music of the 18th and early 19th centuries.

He is a leading member of the new generation of specialist early music performers. He is regularly invited to conduct at the celebrated European music festivals in halls, and since 2002, He became the chief conductor and artistic director of The Hague's Baroque Orchestra, The New Dutch Academy (NDA).

Murphy is notable for his pioneering work in rediscovering and reintroducing FORGOTTEN on the 18th-century, European and symphonic composers, particularly from and related to the Mannheim School (Mannheimer Schule). Resulting from his research, Murphy has also been responsible for unveiling the previously unknown Dutch on 18th-century symphonic tradition, and presenting it to the world through performances on radio and TV broadcasts, and the first CD recording of symphonic heritage. In particular, he has championed 18th-century composers Joseph Schmitt "The Dutch Haydn" and Francesco Zappa, making the first CD recordings and new editions of their symphonic works.

Murphy has won major music industry awards, including the Dutch Edison Award and Luxembourg's Supersonic Award. His groundbreaking performance of Corelli's Concerti Grossi at the Utrecht Early Music Festival in 2003, recorded for CD by Pentatone, was chosen as one of the top 5 highlights of the festival's 30-year history. 

Murphy made his Amsterdam Het Concertgebouw and Brussels Le Palais des Beaux-Arts (BOZAR / Centre for Fine Arts) conducting débuts in 2004, and his débuts at the Handel Festival, Halle, in 2008 and Bachfest Leipzig in 2010. In the double role of conductor/soloist (viola), Murphy has appeared at major venues and festivals including The Concertgebouw Amsterdam, Sydney Festival, Istanbul Music Festival and Premiere Performances Hong Kong. As a guest conductor, he has worked with a wide variety of ensembles, choirs and orchestras ranging from the Queensland Symphony Orchestra to the Latvian State Choir and Strasbourg Philharmonic Orchestra. 

As a performer, programmer and curator, he is also known for his work in the realm of international cultural diplomacy.

Profile and reputation 

Praised as "a repertoire-refresher" by France's Diapason, "the Indiana Jones of the Baroque" by Dutch classical radio, "a musician with 'guts': a conductor with the passion and conviction of a born missionary" by De Volkskrant, and "The hottest property on the European baroque scene" by The Australian, Murphy has won international recognition for his performances of established orchestral repertoire as well as for his work in bringing new, rediscovered masterworks to life on the concert platform and on disc.

Murphy was awarded the Edison Music Award for his first recordings of "Mannheimer Schule" symphonies, was labelled as "a conductor to watch for" by the American Record Guide, and has had his performances referred to as "18th-century rock 'n roll!" by Dutch classical music magazine .

Performances 

At home, Murphy's performances in the low countries have included cycles of Stamitz, Mozart, Haydn, Beethoven and Mendelssohn symphonies for Dutch radio at Amsterdam's Het Concertgebouw, Rotterdam's De Doelen, Utrecht's Vredenburg and The Hague's Philipszaal. International concert touring has taken Murphy through Europe, the US, Canada, Russia, Asia and Australia. His live concert performances have been broadcast by NTR, AVRO, RNW, EBU, DLF, MDR, RAI and ABC.

His work with the New Dutch Academy has included establishing the orchestra's symphonic, Baroque and chamber concert series in its home city of The Hague, as well as creating new stage productions, festivals and outreach programmes, as well as the orchestra's international touring activities. His programming with the orchestra has included instrumental, vocal, symphonic and operatic repertoire, ranging from Corelli, Bach and Handel to Mozart, Beethoven, Haydn, Cimarosa, Paisiello, Rossini, Mendelssohn and Lortzing. One of Murphy's stage productions with the New Dutch Academy celebrates the infamous 18th-century singer, actress, impresario and entrepreneur "Mrs. Cornelys" (aka Teresa Cornelys) and her London circle of Bach, Abel, Garrick, Gainsborough and Casanova, and was created together with the American Baroque dancer and choreographer, Caroline Copeland. The production received its première in The Hague in 2012.

Discography 

Murphy's discography includes world première presentations of works of 18th-century symphonists Stamitz, Richter, Abel, Reichardt, Schmitt ("The Dutch Haydn"),  and Zappa.

His CD of Corelli's Concerti Grossi, made during the 2003 Utrecht Early Music Festival, was the first disc to present Corelli's own large-scale, authentic, orchestral soundscape, featuring Corelli's preferred instrumentation with lots of continuo instruments (cello, bass, organs, harpsichords, baroque lutes, baroque guitars, archlutes and theorbos) and improvisation. It was voted by Dutch national radio as one of the top 5 highlights in the 30-year history of the festival and was reviewed by the BBC Music Magazine as "the best of both worlds ... the NDA is a big band playing on period instruments".

Murphy's CD albums for PENTATONE include Early Mannheim String Symphonies by Stamitz and Richter Vol. 1 and Vol. 2 (2003 and 2004), Corelli Concerti Grossi (2004), Joseph Schmitt "The Dutch Haydn" Early Symphonies (2006) and Zappa Symphonies / Symphonies from the Court of Orange, The Hague (2009). His 2017 release on PENTATONE, GRAND TOUR Baroque Road Trip, features works by Telemann, Vivaldi, van Wassenaer, Bach, and Murphy performing Telemann's Viola Concerto in G in the double role of soloist/director. His seventh album with PENTATONE, "JET SET! Classical Glitterati" (2019), features Murphy performing the Viola Concerto in E-flat by Zelter in the double role of soloist/conductor alongside first recordings of symphonies by Abel and Reichardt. 

Murphy's live performances have been featured on live CD sets by the Dutch national broadcaster and include performances of Mozart and Beethoven Symphonies.

Other honours 

For the visit of the Queen Beatrix of the Netherlands to Italy in 2004, Murphy was chosen to programme and conduct the Royal Command Performance given in Rome's Palazzo Quirinale, broadcast live on RAI. Murphy arranged and conducted the music for the 400-year, bilateral celebrations between Australia and the Netherlands in 2006, in both countries. In 2009, he was chosen to represent the Netherlands at the Cultural Olympiade in Vancouver, Canada and at the Hudson 400 celebrations in New York. In 2012, he represented the Netherlands at the bilateral celebrations of 40 years of diplomatic relations between the Kingdom of the Netherlands and People's Republic of China. In 2016, he opened the official bilateral Dutch Australian 1616 - 2016 celebrations with a concert performance in the Sydney Festival at the Sydney City Recital Hall attended by the Governor General of Australia and the Dutch Ambassador, broadcast by ABC Classic FM. 

In 2004, Murphy was awarded the Netherlands' Edison Music Award. 

In 2005, his performance of Mozart Symphony No. 41 (Jupiter) in the Utrecht Early Music Festival was chosen by the Dutch world service (RNW) as one of the highlights of the entire Dutch cultural season 2005–2006 and was featured in a series of live discs by the RNW. His performance of Beethoven's Symphony no. 1 and Haydn's Symphony no. 104 "London" in 2007 in the concert hall De Doelen, Rotterdam was chosen by Dutch broadcaster NPS as a highlight out of hundreds of hours of live recorded concerts in the radio's archives and was featured in 2010 in a series of live NPS portrait CDs in co-operation together with the low countries' classical music magazine Luister.

In 2012, Murphy was appointed music advisor to the Netherlands' Prinsjes Festival. 

Between 2012 and 2019, he was curator of the Classical & Jazz Stage at the Netherlands' Embassy Festival. 

In 2019, Murphy received the Charles Burney Award from the Dutch national Prins Bernhard Cultuurfonds.

Education and early years 

Murphy received his early, music tuition as a music scholar at the Scots College in Sydney. He completed his undergraduate studies in the areas of music performance, musicology and fine arts at the University of Sydney in 1996. He studied the viola with Russian-Australian Leonid Volovelsky and early music performance with Hans-Dieter Michatz and Geoffrey Lancaster. He taught at The University of Newcastle Conservatorium of Music, and played in the Sydney Symphony Orchestra under conductors David Porcelijn and Hans Vonk.

Murphy moved to the Netherlands in 1996 where he was further educated by the leading lights of the Dutch early music revival. He studied baroque viola with Alda Stuurop at the Utrechts Conservatorium (between 1996 and 1999) and performed extensively with legendary figures including Frans Brüggen and Gustav Leonhardt in leading European authentic instrument ensembles such as The Orchestra of the 18th-century. Between 2000 and 2005, Murphy was also the violist of The Amsterdam String Quartet.

For his study, he was awarded grants by the Sir Ian Potter Foundation and the Netherlands Performing Arts Fund.

Recitals 

Alongside his conducting activities, Murphy is active as a viola soloist, recitalist and chamber musician, also performing on Bach's own hand-held violoncello piccolo (also known as the viola da spalla or viola pomposa). On this instrument, he was invited to give a special of recitals in original Bach castles as part of the Bachfest Leipzig and Thüringer Bachwochen.

His recital partners have included harpsichordists Menno van Delft and Mahan Esfahani, and lutenist/guitarist Karl Nyhlin.

Teaching 

Murphy has given masterclasses, workshops and lecture-recitals at international institutions including The Royal Conservatory of The Hague; The Royal College of Music, Stockholm; The Sydney Conservatorium of Music; Central Conservatory, Beijing; The Glinka Conservatorium, Nizhny Novgorod; and The Getty Center, Los Angeles on topics including historically informed performance.

References

External links 
Artist's Official Website http://www.simonmurphyconductor.com
Official Website of The New Dutch Academy https://web.archive.org/web/20130626000623/http://thehaguebaroqueorchestra.com/ and http://www.newdutchacademy.nl
Pentatone http://www.pentatonemusic.com

Australian conductors (music)
Musicians from Sydney
Living people
1973 births
21st-century conductors (music)
21st-century Australian musicians